Under Suspicion: Uncovering the Wesphael Case is a Belgian crime drama serial directed by Alain Brunard, created by Georges Huercano and Pascal Vrebos and starring Nadine Pirotton, Bernard Sohet and Bernard Wesphael. The five-part limited series is a co-production between RTL-TVI, Belgium and Netflix.

Cast 
 Nadine Pirotton
 Bernard Sohet
 Bernard Wesphael
 Luc Gochel
 Jean-Philippe Mayence
 Vincent Demonty
 Marc Metdepenningen
 Jean Thiel
 Patrice 'Topy' Dullens
 Diego Smessaert
 Ignacio de la Serna
 Jan Cordonnier
 Tom Bauwens
 Romuald Servranckx
 Oswald De Cock

References

External links
 
 

French television miniseries
2020s French television series
2022 French television series endings
2010s French television miniseries